Trichoptilus subtilis is a moth of the family Pterophoridae that is known from South Africa. The species was first described by Hans Rebel in 1907.

References

Endemic moths of South Africa
Oxyptilini
Moths described in 1907
Endemic fauna of South Africa
Moths of Africa